Sheikh Ahmad Nasser Al-Mohammad Al-Sabah (born 13 February 1971) is the former Minister of Foreign Affairs of Kuwait.

References 

1971 births
Kuwaiti politicians
Living people